A Flood in Baath Country is a Syrian documentary film by the director Omar Amiralay. The film was ranked #45 on the Dubai International Film Festival's 2013 list of the top 100 Arab films.

References

External links
 Grand Prix du long métrage documentaire - Festival du film arabe à Institut du Monde Arabe, Paris.

Free Syrian Translators: Flood in Baath Land (with English subtitles)

2000s Arabic-language films
2003 films
Syrian documentary films
Films directed by Omar Amiralay
2003 documentary films
Documentary films about politics
Documentary films about Syria